This was the first edition of the women's event.

Magdalena Fręch and An-Sophie Mestach won the title, defeating Chang Kai-chen and Marina Erakovic in the final, 6–4, 7–6(7–5).

Seeds

Draw

References
Main Draw

Aegon Manchester Trophy - Doubles
Aegon Manchester Trophy